Arturo Barrios Flores (born December 12, 1962 in Mexico City) is a Mexican long-distance runner who set the 10,000 m world record in 1989, the one hour world record in 1991, and the 20,000 m world record en route to the one hour run world record.

Career

Barrios finished in fifth place in the 10,000 metres at the 1988 Summer Olympics. He is a former world record holder at the 10,000 m (27:08.23, set on August 18, 1989 at the Internationales Stadionfest (ISTAF) in Berlin, Germany). Barrios' record was not broken until 1993 when Richard Chelimo ran 27:07.91 in Stockholm.  This mark stood as the North American record until May 1, 2010, and still stands as the national record of Mexico.

On March 30, 1991, Barrios set world records at one hour (21.101 km) and 20,000 m (56:55.6). These records stood until June 2007, when they were broken by Haile Gebrselassie. Barrios' 1991 performance makes him the first man ever to run a half-marathon distance in less than one hour; the first to do so in an actual half-marathon competition was Moses Tanui in 1993.  That performance also still stands as the North American records and the Mexican record for those two events.

In 1992 he participated in the World Cup in Athletics, running the 5000 m with a time of 13:50.95, finishing in second place.

Between 1987 and 1990, Barrios won the San Francisco Bay to Breakers race, considered the largest footrace in the world, four consecutive times.

Barrios became a United States citizen in September 1994. Barrios graduated from Texas A&M University in 1985 where he competed in track and cross country. Barrios was inducted into the Texas A&M Athletic Hall of Fame in 1998. 

The annual Arturo Barrios Invitational 5K and 10K road races in Chula Vista, California, launched in 1989, were held for the last time in 2006.

Personal records

Achievements

References

External links

The history of the Hour run
Youtube video of 10,000 m World Record

1962 births
Living people
Athletes from Mexico City
Mexican male long-distance runners
Olympic male long-distance runners
Olympic athletes of Mexico
Athletes (track and field) at the 1988 Summer Olympics
Athletes (track and field) at the 1992 Summer Olympics
Pan American Games gold medalists for Mexico
Pan American Games medalists in athletics (track and field)
Athletes (track and field) at the 1987 Pan American Games
Athletes (track and field) at the 1991 Pan American Games
Medalists at the 1987 Pan American Games
Medalists at the 1991 Pan American Games
Central American and Caribbean Games gold medalists for Mexico
Central American and Caribbean Games medalists in athletics
Competitors at the 1990 Central American and Caribbean Games
World record setters in athletics (track and field)